Number 10, #10 or variations thereof may refer to:

 10 (number), the natural number itself
 10 Downing Street, the UK Prime Minister's office
 No. 10, a standard envelope size in North America

Fiction, art and entertainment
 #10 (The Guess Who album)
 Number 10 (J. J. Cale album)
 Number Ten (Manning album)
 Number 10 (TV series), a 1983 drama about seven British Prime Ministers
 Number 10 (drama series), a radio program about a fictional British Prime Minister
 Number Ten (novel), by Sue Townsend
No. 10 (Rothko), a 1958 painting
 Number 10, a film about rugby union by Darrell Roodt
 Number Ten, a variation of the solitaire card game Forty Thieves
 #10, the designation of Sportacus, a major character in the children's television show LazyTown

Other uses
 Number 10, the shirt number often worn by an association football team's playmaker
 Guy Lafleur (1953-2022), Canadiens hockey player with sweater number 10, frequently known by his number
 , any of several ships

See also 
 Ten (disambiguation)
 Nummer 10, Danish association football club F.C. Copenhagen's training ground